Carlos Martínez Aibar (born 29 August 1989) is a Spanish footballer who plays as a midfielder for Italian club Abano Calcio.

Club career
Born in Cádiz, Andalusia, Martínez finished his development at local Cádiz CF. On 29 September 2007, at the age of 18, he made his debut with the first team, coming in as a 77th-minute substitute in a 0–2 away loss against CD Castellón.

Martínez moved abroad in 2013, signing with C.D. Luis Ángel Firpo in the Salvadoran Primera División and competing in the CONCACAF Champions League. He switched clubs and countries the following year, joining FK Sūduva in the Lithuanian A Lyga.

In the 2015–16 season, Martínez represented Coquimbo Unido, featuring rarely and also being relegated from the Primera B de Chile. He returned to his homeland on 26 November 2017 and signed with amateurs UD Oliva but, less than one month later, moved to the Italian Serie D with Abano Calcio.

Personal life
Martínez's grandfather, Ramoní, was also a footballer. He represented mainly Sevilla FC.

References

External links

Stats and bio at Cadistas1910  

1989 births
Living people
Footballers from Cádiz
Spanish footballers
Association football midfielders
Segunda División players
Tercera División players
Cádiz CF B players
Cádiz CF players
CD Guijuelo footballers
C.D. Luis Ángel Firpo footballers
A Lyga players
FK Sūduva Marijampolė players
Primera B de Chile players
Coquimbo Unido footballers
Spanish expatriate footballers
Expatriate footballers in Austria
Expatriate footballers in El Salvador
Expatriate footballers in Lithuania
Expatriate footballers in Chile
Expatriate footballers in Italy
Spanish expatriate sportspeople in Austria
Spanish expatriate sportspeople in Chile
Spanish expatriate sportspeople in Italy